Barnabás Hevesy (born 26 April 1950) is a Hungarian equestrian. He competed in two events at the 1980 Summer Olympics.

References

External links
 

1950 births
Living people
Hungarian male equestrians
Olympic equestrians of Hungary
Equestrians at the 1980 Summer Olympics
Sportspeople from Budapest
20th-century Hungarian people